Elisabeth Margot "Ellie" van den Brom (born 18 June 1949) is a retired speed skater from the Netherlands who competed at the 1968 and 1972 Winter Olympics. In 1968 she was placed fifth in the 500 m, whereas in 1972 she finished in tenth, seventh and fourth place in the 500, 1000 and 1500 m events. In 1969 she set a new world record on the 1000 m and five national records on 500 m and 1000 m.

References

1949 births
Dutch female speed skaters
Olympic speed skaters of the Netherlands
Speed skaters at the 1968 Winter Olympics
Speed skaters at the 1972 Winter Olympics
Sportspeople from Amsterdam
Living people
20th-century Dutch women
21st-century Dutch women